John Shanssey (March 23, 1848 – 1919?) was an American boxer, gambler, saloon owner, and Mayor of Yuma, Arizona. He fought Mike Donovan in a bout refereed by a young 21-year-old Wyatt Earp on July 4, 1868, or 1869 in Cheyenne, Wyoming.

References

 City of Yuma

1848 births
Boxers from Arizona
Year of death missing
Mayors of places in Arizona
People from Yuma, Arizona
American male boxers
Saloonkeepers